Hardcastle syndrome is a rare genetic disorder on chromosome 9 at 9p22-p21. It affects the long bones. There is a high risk for histiocytoma.

References

External links

Long bones
Rare cancers
Genetic diseases and disorders